SpVgg Ruhmannsfelden is a German association football club from the municipality of Ruhmannsfelden, Bavaria. The club's greatest success has been promotion to the tier five Bayernliga in 2015.

History
SpVgg Ruhmannsfelden was formed after the Second World War, in 1946.

Long an amateur side in local football SpVgg Ruhmannsfelden first rose above the Lower Bavarian football level when it won promotion to the tier four Landesliga Bayern-Mitte in 1984. Coming last in the league in 1984–85 the club promptly dropped back down but won promotion for a second time in 1988. It lasted for two seasons this time, coming thirteenth in 1989 but last once more the season after.

Following relegation from the Landesliga, Ruhmannsfelden spent the next twenty two seasons in either the Bezirksoberliga Niederbayern, a league established in 1988, or the Bezirksliga below, with the exception of a three-year stint in the A-Klasse from 1994. Relegation so from the Bezirksoberliga in 1992 and 2003 were followed by promotions back to the league in 1998 and 2006. Generally the club played as a mid table side in the Bezirksoberliga and only came close to promotion back to the Landesliga once, when it finished runners-up in 2009 but failed to earn promotion. In 2012, with the reorganisation of the Bavarian league system Ruhmannsfelden had the opportunity to qualify for the Landesliga despite having finished only eleventh in the Bezirksoberliga. The club was successful at this by defeating SV Schalding-Heining II and FC Vilshofen and returned to Landesliga football from 2012.

From 2012 he club became part of the new Landesliga Bayern-Mitte, a league different in territory from the old Landesliga Mitte. Ruhmannsfelden played as a mid table side in its first two seasons there but won the league in 2014–15 and earned promotion to the southern division of the Bayernliga for the first time. The club came last in the Bayernliga in 2015–16 and was relegated back to the Landesliga.

Honours
The club's honours:
 Landesliga Bayern-Mitte
 Champions: 2015
 Bezirksoberliga Niederbayern
 Runners-up: 2009
 Bezirksliga Niederbayern-Ost
 Champions: 1981, 1998, 2006

Recent seasons
The recent season-by-season performance of the club:

 With the introduction of the Regionalligas in 1994 and the 3. Liga in 2008 as the new third tier, below the 2. Bundesliga, all leagues below dropped one tier.

References

External links
Official team site 
SpVgg Ruhmannsfelden at Weltfussball.de 
SpVgg Ruhmannsfelden at fupa.net 

Football clubs in Germany
Football clubs in Bavaria
Football in Lower Bavaria
Association football clubs established in 1946
1946 establishments in Germany